Theresa Kobuszewski [Koby or Tracy] (July 15, 1920 – March 22, 2005) was an American pitcher who played from  through  in the All-American Girls Professional Baseball League.

Born in Wyandotte, Michigan, Theresa Kobuszewski was a feary and respected underhand pitcher for fifteen years before joining the All-American Girls Professional Baseball League as a 26-year-old rookie in 1946.

Kobuszewski played for the Keller Girls softball team at Mack Park, which was the original home field of Detroit's Negro National League franchise Detroit Stars, and then joined the Women's Army Corps (WAC)  in 1942. In the process, she was the winning pitcher in the championship game between the Army and Navy teams. Her softball experience made her an attractive selection for AAGPBL scouts. Unfortunately, she could not adjust when the league switched for a strictly overhand pitching in 1948.

Kobuszewski entered the AAGPBL in 1946 with the Kenosha Comets, playing for them one and a half years before joining the Fort Wayne Daisies in the 1947 midseason. In her rookie season she finished with a 3–9 record and a 2.71 earned run average in 123 innings of work, spanning 21 games. She improved to an 11–15 mark and a 2.42 ERA in 1947, striking out 47 batters in 208 innings while playing with both Kenosha and Fort Wayne.

In a two-season career, Kobuszewski collected a 14–24 record in 51 games, despite a solid 2.53 ERA. She also helped herself with the bat, posting a .242 batting average (30-for-124) in 52 games, while driving in six runs and scoring 15 times.

Since 1988 Kobuszewski is part of Women in Baseball, a permanent display based at the Baseball Hall of Fame and Museum in Cooperstown, New York, which was unveiled to honor the entire All-American Girls Professional Baseball League rather than individual baseball personalities. She died in Trenton, Michigan, at the age of 84.

Pitching statistics

References

All-American Girls Professional Baseball League players
Kenosha Comets players
Fort Wayne Daisies players
Baseball players from Michigan
People from Trenton, Michigan
People from Wyandotte, Michigan
Women in World War II
1920 births
2005 deaths
20th-century American women
21st-century American women